Frédérik Peeters (born 14 August 1974, in Geneva) is a contemporary Swiss graphic novelist.

Biography
Peeters received his bachelor of arts degree in visual communication from the École Supérieure d’Arts Appliqués in Geneva in 1995. Peeters currently lives with his partner Cati, her son, and their daughter in Geneva.

His autobiographical graphic novel Blue Pills received the Polish Jury Prize at the Angoulême International Comics Festival, where it was also nominated for Best Book. Blue Pills also won the Premios La Cárcel de Papel in Spain for Best Foreign Comic. This is his first work to be translated into English.

Other graphic novels include Pachyderme (nominated for the Grand Prix at the Angoulême International Comics Festival 2010), Lupus, RG, and Koma.  He has worked with documentary film-maker Pierre Oscar Lévy on an adaptation of Blue Pills for that medium. Subsequently, in 2010 the two collaborated on a science fiction graphic novel, available in English in 2011 as Sandcastle. The novel was adapted into an M. Night Shyamalan film, Old.

He is also the author and illustrator of Aâma, a science-fiction series released in four parts between March, 2014, and September, 2015.

Notes

External links
 Interview in The Guardian
 Frederik Peeters offizielle tumblr Seite
 Another site
 

1974 births
Graphic novelists
Swiss comics writers
Swiss comics artists
Swiss expatriates in France
Living people